Hernandia beninensis is a species of plant in the Hernandiaceae family. It is endemic to São Tomé and Príncipe and is listed as near threatened by the IUCN.

References

Hernandiaceae
Near threatened plants
Endemic flora of São Tomé and Príncipe
Taxonomy articles created by Polbot